Basie Jazz is an album by pianist/bandleader Count Basie recorded in 1952 and released on the Clef label in 1954. Selections from this album were also released on the 1956 Clef LPs The Swinging Count! and Basie Rides Again!.

Reception

AllMusic awarded the album 3 stars.

Track listing
 "Extended Blues" (Count Basie, Oscar Peterson) – 5:58 	
 "Be My Guest" (Ernie Wilkins) – 3:03 	
 "Blues for the Count and Oscar" (Basie, Peterson) – 3:10  	
 "Oh, Lady Be Good!" (George Gershwin, Ira Gershwin) – 2:26 	
 "I Want a Little Girl"  (Murray Mencher, Billy Moll) – 2:54 	
 "Song of the Islands" (Charles E. King) – 2:52 	
 "Goin' to Chicago" (Count Basie) – 3:22 	
 "Sent for You Yesterday and Here You Come Today" (Count Basie, Eddie Durham, Jimmy Rushing) – 3:13 	
 "Bread" (Wilkins) – 2:33 	
 "There's a Small Hotel" (Richard Rodgers, Lorenz Hart) – 3:33	
 "Tippin' on the Q. T." (Buck Clayton) – 3:33 	
 "Blee-Blop Blues" (A. K. Salim) – 3:03
Recorded at Fine Sound Studios in New York City on July 22 (tracks 9–12), July 26 (tracks 1–3) and December 12 (tracks 4–8), 1952

Personnel 
Count Basie – piano, organ
Paul Campbell (tracks 2 & 7–12) Wendell Culley (tracks 2 & 7–12), Reunald Jones (tracks 2, 4, 5 & 7–12), Joe Newman (tracks 2 & 7–12) – trumpet
Henry Coker (tracks 2, 4, 5 & 7–12), Benny Powell (tracks 2 & 7–12), Jimmy Wilkins (tracks 2 & 7–12) – trombone 
Marshall Royal – alto saxophone, clarinet (tracks 2, 4, 5 & 7–12)
Ernie Wilkins –  alto saxophone, tenor saxophone, arranger (tracks 2 & 7–12)
Eddie "Lockjaw" Davis (tracks 2, 3 & 7–12), Paul Quinichette (tracks 2 & 4–12) – tenor saxophone
Charlie Fowlkes – baritone saxophone (tracks 2, 4, 5 & 7–12)
Oscar Peterson – piano, organ (tracks 1–3)
Freddie Green – guitar 
Ray Brown (tracks 1–3), Jimmy Lewis (tracks 9–12), Gene Ramey (tracks 4–8) – bass
Gus Johnson (tracks 1–3 & 7–12), Buddy Rich (tracks 4–6) – drums
Al Hibbler – vocals (tracks 7 & 8)
Buck Clayton, A. K. Salim – arranger

References 

1954 albums
Count Basie Orchestra albums
Clef Records albums
Verve Records albums
Albums arranged by Ernie Wilkins
Albums produced by Norman Granz